Nöschenrode is a Stadtteil of Wernigerode in Saxony-Anhalt, Germany.

Geographical position 
Nöschenrode is located at the foot of the Harz Mountains in the Mühlental. The Zillierbach, which comes from the Zillierbachtalsperre, flows through the town. The Bundesstraße 244 runs through the town.

History 
It got first recorded in 1370 as Noscherot in a document. The place originated below Wernigerode Castle and belonged to the County of Wernigerode. On the shoreline of the Zillierbach in the Mühlental there were several mills, which were mentioned as early as 1417, including a sawmill, oil mill and marble mill. With the preservation of wood justice, the place received an economic boom. On 30 September 1929, Nöschenrode was incorporated into Wernigerode.

References 

Former municipalities in Saxony-Anhalt
Wernigerode